The 2013–14 Mississippi Valley State Delta Devils basketball team represented Mississippi Valley State University during the 2013–14 NCAA Division I men's basketball season. The Delta Devils, led by second year head coach Chico Potts,  were members of the Southwestern Athletic Conference. Other than one exhibition game, due to renovations at their normal home arena, the Harrison HPER Complex, they played their home games at the Leflore County Civic Center in Greenwood, Mississippi and one home game at The Pinnacle on the campus of Coahoma Community College. They finished the season 9–23, 5–13 in SWAC play to finish in ninth place.  They were ineligible for postseason play due to APR penalties. However, the SWAC received a waiver to allow its teams under APR penalties to still participate in the SWAC tournament where the Delta Devils lost in the first round to Prairie View A&M.

Roster

Schedule

|-
!colspan=9 style="background:#228B22; color:#FFFFFF;"| Exhibition

|-
!colspan=9 style="background:#228B22; color:#FFFFFF;"| Regular season

|-
!colspan=9 style="background:#228B22; color:#FFFFFF;"| 2014 SWAC tournament

References

Mississippi Valley State Delta Devils basketball seasons
Mississippi Valley State
Mississippi Valley State Delta Devils basketball
Mississippi Valley State Delta Devils basketball